So Good is a 2008 till 2010 cooking series/variety program produced by TVB and WellFit Productiopns Ltd., also sponsored by Town Gas. This is the first TVB program that had an outsourced production company.

Originally intended to be a 10 series cooking series, So Good became a hit amongst audiences in Hong Kong and abroad resulting in additional episodes added with 99 episodes total when the series ended. The show is hosted by So Sze Wong and the 99 episodes aired from 22 September 2008 to 2 October 2009.

Presenters
So was a popular Cable TV Hong Kong cooking show before she was signed on with TVB. She is also a local radio DJ.

88.1 FM DJ Taishan (泰山) is a former co-host of the program, but he disappears in later episodes. So also parts way with assistant Kendy Lee, a former model.

Format
The show features Cantonese cuisine from Hong Kong, Macau and China. The show consists of two segments, the first introduces the ingredients and the second consists of the actual process of cooking of the ingredients.

Most of the show is taped in studio, but there are scenes from locations across Hong Kong and a few from Macau.

Broadcasts
Aired on TVB, the series are now available on DVD. It is also aired in China and overseas (Canada and the United States).

Television Broadcast Limited ©MMVIII  (http://www.tvb.com)

References

External links
TVB official website
So Sze Wong blog

TVB original programming
Chinese cooking television series